This is a list of Russian sail frigates of the period 1694–1852:
The format is: Name, number of guns (rank/real amount), launch year (A = built in Arkhangelsk), fate (service = combat service, BU = broken up)

Sail frigates of war

Early Russian frigates
2 small frigates (1689, training vessels on Lake Pleshcheyevo) – Discarded 1723, burnt 1783
Sviatoi Apostol Pavel 24 ("Святой Апостол Павел", 1694, A) – In October 1694 sent from White Sea to France as a merchant ship with the state goods, captured by France just in harbour because sailed under the Dutch ensign during the War of the Grand Alliance
Sviatoye Prorochestvo 44 (Santa Prophetia) ("Святое Пророчество" or "Санта Профетиа") (1694, Dutch-built for Russia) – Converted to merchant vessel after 1695 and sent from Arkhangelsk to Europe with goods, last mentioned 1694

Sviatogo Dukha-class (2 units)

Sviatogo Dukha 12 ("Святого Духа", 1702, A) – Dragged over the land to Lake Onega 1702, sailed to Lake Ladoga and participated in assault of Nöteburg 1702, last mentioned 1702 (probably damaged by ice and wrecked in winter 1702/1703)
Kur‘yer 12 ("Курьер", 1702, A) - Dragged over the land to Lake Onega 1702, sailed to Lake Ladoga and participated in assault of Nöteburg 1702, last mentioned 1702 (probably damaged by ice and wrecked in winter 1702/1703)

Frigates of the Baltic Fleet (1703–1852)

Sias‘skii-class (2 units)

fan Sas № 1 18 ("фан Сас № 1", 1702) - Converted to fire-ship and renamed Etna ("Этна") 1705
fan Sas № 2 18 ("фан Сас № 2", 1702) - Converted to fire-ship and renamed Vezuvii ("Везувий") 1705

Shtandart 28 ("Штандарт", 1703) – Classified as 28-gun ship until 1710, BU 1730, Exact replica launched 1999
Sviatoi Ilya 26 ("Святой Илья", 1703, A) – Wrecked at the Baltic Sea 1712

Shlissel‘burg-class (7 units)

Shlissel‘burg 28/24 ("Шлиссельбург", 1704) - Classified as 28-gun ship until 1710, BU after 1710
Kronshlot 28/24 ("Кроншлот", 1704) – Classified as 28-gun ship until 1710, BU after 1710
Peterburg 28/24 ("Петербург", 1704) – Classified as 28-gun ship until 1710, BU after 1710
Triumph 28/24 ("Триумф", 1704) – Classified as 28-gun ship until 1710, converted to fire-ship 1710
Derpt 28/24 ("Дерпт", 1704) – Classified as 28-gun ship until 1710, converted to fire-ship 1710
Narva 28/24 ("Нарва", 1704) – Classified as 28-gun ship until 1710, BU after 1710
Fligel‘-de-Fam 28/24 ("Флигель-де-Фам", 1704) - Classified as 28-gun ship until 1710, flagship of vice-admiral Cornelius Cruys at the Kronstadt defence 1705 during the Great Northern War, converted to fire-ship 1710

Mikhail Arkhangel-class (2 units)

Mikhail Arkhangel 28 ("Михаил Архангел", 1704) – Classified as 28-gun ship until 1710, BU after 1710
Ivan-gorod 28 ("Иван-город", 1705) – Classified as 28-gun ship until 1710, BU after 1710
anonymous – BU on slip 1705
Olifant 32/26 ("Олифант", 1705) – Classified as 32-gun ship until 1710, BU 1712
Dumkrat 32/26 ("Думкрат", 1707) – Classified as 32-gun ship until 1710, BU 1713

Sviatoi Piotr-class (2 units)

Sviatoi Piotr 32 ("Святой Пётр", 1710, A) – BU 1719
Sviatoi Pavel 32 ("Святой Павел", 1710, A) – BU in Copenhagen 1716
Samson 32 ("Самсон", 1711, Dutch-built for Russia) – Visited Britain 1715, hulked 1733, BU after 1739
Sviatoi Yakov 32/22 ("Святой Яков", ex-Dutch ?) - Purchased in Holland 1711, BU after 1732
Esperans 44 ("Эсперанс") (ex-Dutch 50-gun ship Hardenbroek, captured by France in 1706 and renamed Esperance) – Purchased in France 1712, visited France 1726–1727, BU after 1739
Sviatoi Nikolai 42/50 ("Святой Николай", ex-Dutch ?) - Purchased in Holland 1712, converted to transport 1716
Lansdou 32 ("Лансдоу", ex-French, ex-Britain HMS Norris) – Purchased in Britain 1713, BU 1725
Richmond 44 ("Ричмонд", ex-British HMS Swiftsure) – Purchased 1714 in Britain, BU 1721
Sviatoi Ilya 32 ("Святой Илья", 1714) – Armed by flame throwers 1717, BU 1721
Amsterdam-Galey 32 ("Амстердам-Галей", 1720, Dutch-built for Russia) – Visited Spain 1725–1726, wrecked 1740 near Greifswalder Oie Island 1740
Dekrondelivde (also De kroon de liefde, "Декронделивде") 32 (1720, Dutch-built for Russia) – Visited Spain 1725–1726, last mentioned 1743
Endracht 32 ("Эндрахт", 1720, Dutch-built for Russia) – Captured by Sweden during the route to Russia in 1720, further fate unknown

Kreyser-class (3 units)

Kreyser 32 ("Крейсер", 1723) – BU 1732
Yacht-hound 32 ("Яхт-хунд", 1724) – BU 1736
Wind-hound 32 ("Винд-хунд", 1724) – BU 1736
Rossiya 32 ("Россия", 1728) – BU 1752
Vakhmeister 46 ("Вахмейстер", 1732) – Last mentioned 1742
Mitau 32 ("Митау", 1733) – Captured by France in 1734 during the War of the Polish Succession, released 1734, BU 1747
Printsessa Anna 12 ("Принцесса Анна", 1733) – Renamed Sviatoi Yakov ("Святой Яков") 1745, BU after 1755

Gektor-class (16 units)

Gektor 32 ("Гектор", 1736, A) – Wrecked 1742
Voin 32 ("Воин", 1737, A) – BU 1755
Kavaler 32 ("Кавалер", 1737, A) – BU 1755
Merkurius 32 ("Меркуриус", 1740, A) – Wrecked in Kattegat 1743
Apollon 32 ("Аполлон", 1740, A) – BU 1756
Selafail 32 ("Селафаил", 1746, A) – BU 1760
Yagudiil 32 ("Ягудиил", 1746, A) – BU 1760
Arkhangel Mikhail 32 ("Архангел Михаил", 1748, A) – Wrecked 1760
Kreyser 32 ("Крейсер", 1751, A) – BU 1763
Vakhtmeister 32 ("Вахтмейстер", 1754, A) – Sunk from leak 1757
Rossiya 32 ("Россия", 1754, A) – BU 1771
Sviatoi Mikhail 32 ("Святой Михаил", 1758, A) – BU 1771
Sviatoi Sergii 32 ("Святой Сергий", 1761, A) – BU 1771
Gremiaschii 32 ("Гремящий", 1763, A) – Converted to harbour vessel 1778
Nadezhda 32 ("Надежда", 1763, A) – Served at the Aegean Sea 1769–1775, converted to transport vessel 1780
Afrika 32 ("Африка", 1768, A) – Served at the Aegean Sea 1769–1775, BU 1790
Sviatoi Fiodor 32 ("Святой Фёдор", 1762, A) – BU 1774
Vestovoi 8 ("Вестовой", Purchased and converted to frigate 1763–1764) – BU after 1776
Nadezhda Blagopoluchiya 34 ("Надежда Благополучия", 1764) – Built for the voyage to the Mediterranean Sea, served there in 1764 and 1769–1775, BU in Naoussa 1775
Sviatoi Aleksandr 8 ("Святой Александр", 1766) – Last mentioned 1775
Vtoraya Ekaterina 20 ("Вторая Екатерина", ex-yacht, c. 1763, converted to frigate 1773) – Converted to harbour vessel 1777, BU 1782
Pochtalyon 20/24 9 ("Почтальон", ex-packet boat, 1766, converted to frigate 1775) – Served at the Aegean Sea 1769–1775, transferred to the Azov Flotilla in 1775 and to the Black Sea Fleet in 1783, renamed Nikita Muchenik ("Никита Мученик") 1788, converted to bombard ship 1788, BU after 1791
Severnyi Oriol ("Северный Орёл", ex-British ?, 1752) - Purchased in Britain 1770, served at the Aegean Sea in 1770–1775 and in 1776–1779, converted to transport 1780, BU 1790
Grigorii ("Григорий") – Purchased in Archipelago 1770, served at the Aegean Sea in 1771–1774 and in 1776–1779, visited Spain 1782, BU after 1786
Paros 10 ("Парос") – Purchased in Archipelago 1770, served at the Aegean Sea 17701–1775, BU 190
Pobeda 10 ("Победа") – Purchased in Archipelago 1770, served at the Aegean Sea 1771–1775, wrecked at the Crimea coast 1775
Sviatoi Nikolai 26 ("Святой Николай", ex-Greek, voluntary joined to the Russian Archipelago Squadron of count Alexey Orlov and commissioned 1770) – Served at the Aegean Sea in 1770–1775, bombed Beirut 1773, transferred to the Azov Flotilla 1775, visited France 1781 and 1783, BU after 1788
Sviatoi Pavel 22 ("Святой Павел") – Purchased in Livorno 1770, served at the Aegean Sea in 1770–1775 and Mediterranean Sea in 1775–1779, bombed Turkish Damietta & Beirut in 1772–1773, visited Morocco 1778, BU 1782
Slava 16 ("Слава") – Purchased in Archipelago 1770, served at the Aegean Sea 1770–1775, bombed Beirut 1773, sold in Livorno 1776
Fiodor ("Фёдор") – Purchased in Archipelago 1770, served at the Aegean Sea 1770–1771, sunk from leak 1771
Uliss ("Улисс") – Purchased in Archipelago, served at the Aegean Sea 1771–1775, last mentioned 1774
Zapasnyi ("Запасный") – Purchased in Archipelago 1772, served at the Aegean Sea 1772–1775, BU after 1782
Konstantsiya 22 ("Констанция") – Purchased in Archipelago 1772, served at the Aegean Sea in 1772–1775 and in 1776–1779, visited Morocco 1778, BU 1787
Pomoschnyi 20 ("Помощный") – Purchased in Archipelago 1772, served at the Aegean Sea 1772–1775, BU after 1783
Ungaria 26 ("Унгария", ex-Austrian?, 1766) - Purchased in Livorno 1775, BU 1796
Bohemia 26 ("Богемия", ex-Austrian?, 1768) - Purchased in Livorno 1775, Visited Spain 1782, BU 1796
Pavel 32 ("Павел", 1773, A) – Served at the Mediterranean Sea 1773–1779, BU 1791

Astafii-class (16 units)

Astafii 32 ("Астафий", 1773, A) – BU 1793
Nataliya 32 ("Наталия", 1773, A) – Served at the Mediterranean Sea 1773–1779, wrecked ath the North Sea 1779
Liogkii 32 ("Лёгкий", 1773, A) – visited Spain 1782, BU 1793
Stchastlivyi 32 ("Счастливый", 1774, A) – BU 1793
Sviatoi Mikhail 32 ("Святой Михаил", 1774, A) – Visited Spain 1782, BU 1796
Pospeshnyi 32 ("Поспешный", 1774, A) – BU 1791
Aleksandr 32 ("Александр", 1778, A) – Visited Portugal 1780, BU 1804
Voin 32 ("Воин", 1778, A) – Visited Italy 1781-82, BU 1804
Mariya 32 ("Мария", 1778, A) – Visited Italy 1781-82, BU 1804
Patrikii 32 ("Патрикий", 1779, A) – Visited Italy 1781-84 BU,  converted to transport 1801
Simion 32 ("Симион", 1779, A) – Visited Italy 1781-82, BU 1803
Nadezhda 32 ("Надежда", 1781, A) – DU 1799
Slava 32 ("Слава", 1781, A) – Visited Italy 1782-84, converted to harbour vessel 1799
Voz‘mislav 32 ("Возьмислав", 1783, A) - Wrecked 1788
Podrazhislav 32 ("Подражислав", 1783, A) – Last mentioned 1796
Nadezhda Blagopoluchiya 32 ("Надежда Благополучия", 1786, A) – Last mentioned 1798
Gektor 26 ("Гектор", 1781) – Captured by Sweden in 1788 at the very beginning of Russo-Swedish War (1788–1790) (her captain know nothing about the hostile intentions of Swedes), renamed HMS Hector, BU 1818
Mstislavets 44 ("Мстиславец", 1784, A) – Last mentioned 1794
Yaroslavets 35 ("Ярославец", 1784, A) – Captured by Sweden in 1788 at the very beginning of Russo-Swedish War (1788–1790) (her captain know nothing about the hostile intentions of Swedes), renamed HMS Jarislawiz, re-captured by Russia at the Battle of Vyborg Bay (1790), renamed Yaroslavets ("Ярославец") BU 1799
Riga 16 ("Рига", 1784) – BU 1791
Premislav 36 ("Премислав", 1785, A) – Last mentioned 1793

Briachislav-class (8 units)

Briachislav 44/38 ("Брячислав", 1785, A) – Served at the North Sea 1793, BU 1804
Arkhangel Gavriil 44/38 ("Архангел Гавриил", 1787, A) –  BU after 1799
Pomoschnyi 44/38 ("Помощный", 1788, A) – Served at the North Sea 1793, BU after 1799
Kronstadt 44/38 ("Кронштадт", 1789, A) – Visited Britain 1795–1796, BU after 1800
Arkhipelag 44/38 ("Архипелаг", 1789, A) – Served at the North Sea 1793, visited Britain 1795–1797, BU 1809
Narva 44/38 ("Нарва", 1790, A) – Visited Britain in 1794,1795–1797 & 1798–1799, BU 1815
Revel‘ 44/38 ("Ревель", 1790, A) - Visited Britain in 1795–1796, BU after 1805
Riga 44/38 ("Рига", 1790, A) – Visited Britain in 1795–1797 & 1798–1800, BU 1811

Arkhangel Mikhail-class (3 units)

Built according to drawings of ex-Swedish frigate HMS Venus, which had designed by F. af Chapman
Arkhangel Mikhail 44 ("Архангел Михаил", 1791, A) – Served at the North Sea 1793, visited Britain 1795–1796, wrecked 1796
Rafail 44 ("Рафаил", 1791, A) – Visited Britain 1795–1796 & 1799–1800 BU 1804
Stchastlivyi 44 ("Счастливый", 1798, A) – Visited Britain 1798–1800, hulked 1810, BU after 1813
anonymous – BU on slip 1795
Emmanuil 40 ("Эммануил", 1797) – BU 1825
Emprenabl‘ 16 ("Эмпренабль", 1797, court in Gatchina) – BU c. 1800
Pospeshnyi 36/38 ("Поспешный", 1798, A) – Served at the Mediterranean Sea 1798–1800, transferred to the Black Sea Fleet 1800, BU after 1809
Kil‘duin 32 ("Кильдюин", 1798, A; ex- 24-gun transport, converted to 32-gun frigate 1805) - Served at the Adriatic Sea 1805–1807, interned by Britain 1808, released and sold to Britain 1813

Tikhvenskaya Bogoroditsa-class (2 units)

Built according to improved drawings of ex-Swedish frigate HSwMS Venus, designed by F. af Chapman
Tikhvenskaya Bogoroditsa 44 ("Тихвенская Богородица", 1799, A) – Visited Britain 1799–1800, served at the North Sea 1804, BU 1819
Feodosii Totemskii 44 ("Феодосий Тотемский", 1799, A) – Visited Britain 1799–1800, BU 1819

Speshnyi-class (34 units)
The design Speshnyi class proved highly successful with the result that the Russian Navy built 34 over several decades. The first 11 were built over a period of 24 years. The first three were built before 1810, and  three more were built towards the end of the Napoleonic Wars. These last three were built of larch and pine, a decision that sacrificed durability for speed and cost of construction. As a result, the Russian Navy sold these three, and some other frigates, to Spain in 1818. The last five of the initial eleven were laid down between 1818 and 1823. The Great Flood of 1824 damaged three, but the Navy salvaged them, and two (Provoryni (1820) and Konstantin (1824)), fought at the battle of Navarino. By 1831 all of the first 11 had been captured, wrecked, or broken up, with the exception of Konstantin. She was hulked in 1837 and finally broken up in 1848. Between 1825 and 1844 the Navy had another 23 built.
 
First 11 units
Speshnyi 44/50 ("Спешный", 1801, A) – Was the fastest frigate of the contemporary Baltic Fleet, captured by Britain at Portsmouth harbour in 1807 because her captain was not informed of the beginning of Anglo-Russian War (1807–1812)
Liogkii 38 ("Лёгкий", 1803, A) – Served at the Adriatic Sea 1806–1807, sold to France at Trieste 1809. Captured by the British Royal Navy in 1811.
Neva 28 ("Нева", 1805) – BU 1829
Geroi 48 ("Герой", 1807, A) – Wrecked 1808
Argus 44/50 ("Аргус", 1807, A) – Wrecked 1808
Bystryi 44/50 ("Быстрый", 1807, A) – BU 1827
Merkurii 44 ("Меркурий", 1815) – Visited Britain 1816, sold to Spain 1818, renamed Mercurio, scrapped in Cadiz in 1820.
Patrikii 44 ("Патрикий", 1816, A) – Sold to Spain 17 August 1817, transferred in 1818, renamed Maria Isabel, captured by Chile in 1818, renamed O'Higgins, sold to Argentina in 1826, renamed Buenos Aires, sunk in Cape Horn in 1826.
Liogkii 44 ("Лёгкий", 1816) – Sold to Spain 1818, renamed Ligeria, sunk in Santiago de Cuba in 1822
Patrikii 44 ("Патрикий", 1819, A) – BU 1827
Second 23 units

Merkurii 44 ("Меркурий", 1820, A) – Visited Britain 1827, BU 1829
Provornyi 44 ("Проворный", 1820) – Visited France 1824, served at the Mediterranean Sea 1827–1828, BU 1831
Vestovoi 44 ("Вестовой", 1822, A) – Wrecked 1827
Konstantin 44/48 ("Константин", 1824, A) – Visited Britain 1826, served at the Mediterranean Sea 1827–1830, BU 1848
Aleksandra 44/54 ("Александра", 1826, A) – Served at the Aegean Sea 1828–1830, BU 1845
Mariya 44/54 ("Мария", 1827, A) – Served at the Aegean Sea 1828–1830, hulked as depot 1847
Ol‘ga 44/54 ("Ольга", 1827, A) - Served at the Aegean Sea 1828–1830, U 1849
Kniaginia Lovitch 44/54 ("Княгиня Лович", 1828) – Served at the Aegean Sea 1828–1833, flagship of rear admiral Pyotr Rikord during the Civil conflict in Greece (1831–1833), transferred to the Black Sea Fleet 1833, hulked 1837
Elisaveta 44/63 ("Елизавета", 1828) – Served at the Aegean Sea 1829–1831, hulked as depot 1838
Ekaterina 44/56 ("Екатерина", 1828) – BU 1854
Anna 44/54 ("Анна", 1829) – Served at the Aegean Sea 1831–1833, transferred to the Black Sea Fleet 1833, hulked 1838
Prints Oranskii 44/54 ("Принц Оранский", 1829) – Renamed Korol‘ Niderlandskii ("Король Нидерландский") 1841, hulked 1854, BU c. 1858
Neva 44/54 ("Нева", 1829) – Hulked as depot 1837
Venus ("Венус") (ex-Skoryi ("Скорый") – renamed on slip) 44/64 (1829, A) – Hulked 1852
Bellona 44/54 ("Беллона", 1830) – Hulked as depot 1837
Yunona 44/54 ("Юнона", 1830) – Hulked as depot 1845
Pomona 44/54 ("Помона", 1830) – BU 1848
Tserera 44/54 ("Церера", 1830) – Hulked 1854, Sold for BU 1859
Kastor 44/52 ("Кастор", 1831, A) – Voyaged to the Mediterranean Sea 1856–1857, decommissioned 1863, BU 1865
Amfitrida 44/52 ("Амфитрида", 1832, A) – Scuttled to protect Kronstadt harbour 1859
Prozerpina 44/56 ("Прозерпина", 1831) – BU 1855
Diana 44/56 ("Диана", 1832) – Hulked as depot 1850, BU 1854
Avrora or Aurora 44/56 ("Аврора", 1835) – Visited Britain 1844, served at the Northern Pacific 1853–1857, strongest Russian ship in Petropavlosk during the Petropavlosk Action (1854), decommissioned 1861
Mel‘pomena 44/52 ("Мельпомена", 1836, A) - Last mentioned 1849
Tsesarevitch ("Цесаревич") (ex-Ekaterina ("Екатерина") – renamed on slip) 44/58 (1841) – Hulked as depot 1858
Tsesarevna ("Цесаревна") (ex-Bellona ("Беллона") – renamed on slip) 44/58 (1841) – BU 1858
Konstantin 44/58 ("Константин, 1844, A) – Visited Britain 1844, BU 1860

Amfitrida-class (7 units)

Amfitrida 44 ("Амфитрида". 1807) – Visited France 1810, damaged during flood in Kronstadt (1824), BU 1828
Avtroil 44 ("Автроил", 1811) – Sold to Spain 1818, renamed Astrolabio, scrapped in 1820.
Arkhipelag 44 ("Архипелаг", 1811) – Visited Britain in 1812–1814, France and Netherlands in 1814–1815, damaged during flood in Kronstadt (1824), BU 1828
Argus 44 ("Аргус", 1813) – Visited France 1817, damaged during flood in Kronstadt (1824), BU 1828
Diana 44 ("Диана", 1818, A) – Visited Britain 1827, BU 1830
Avtroil 44 ("Автроил", 1819) – Hulked as depot 1827
Liogkiy 44 ("Лёгкий", 1819) – Hulked as depot 1827

Kastor-class (2 units)

Kastor 36 ("Кастор", 1807) – Served at the North Sea 1813, BU 1718
Poluks 36 ("Полукс", 1807) – Wrecked 1809 (140 men lost)
Venera 48 ("Венера", 1808) – Reconstruct to 2-deck 56-gun frigate 1810, Visited Britain 1812–1813, BU 1829
Sveaborg 36 ("Свеаборг", 1808) – Served at the North Sea 1813–1814, damaged during flood in Kronstadt (1824), BU 1828
Poluks 32 ("Полукс", 1812) – Served at the North Sea 1813, damaged during flood in Kronstadt (1824), BU 1828
Rossiya 24 ("Россия", 1814) – First ship of Russian Guards Naval Depot, renamed Ekateringof ("Екатерингоф") 1827, hulked as depot 1831
Neva 28 ("Нева", 1816) – BU 1830

Pomona-class (2 units)

Pomona 24 ("Помона", 1817, A) – BU 1829
Pomoschnyi 24 ("Помощный", 1821, A) – Wrecked 1829

Provornyi-class (8 units)

Provornyi 36 ("Проворный", 1816, A) – Sold to Spain 1818, renamed Viva, scrapped in 1820.
Pospeshnyi 36 ("Поспешный", 1816) – Sold to Spain 1818, renamed Pronta, sunk in Portobelo (Panamá) in 1820.
Gektor 36 ("Гектор", 1817) – Damaged during flood in Kronstadt (1824), BU 1828
Kreyser 36 ("Крейсер", 1821, A) – Sailed to "Russian America" 1822–1825, visited Britain 1827, BU 1831
Aleksandr Nevskii 36 ("Александр Невский", 1821) – Converted to transport and renamed Wind-hound ("Винд-хунд") 1825, BU 1829
Kastor 36 ("Кастор", 1823) – Served at the Mediterranean Sea 1827–1829, BU 1830
Wind-hound ("Винд-хунд", 1823, A) – Damaged during flood in Kronstadt (1824), decommissioned 1826
Elena 36 ("Елена", 1825, A) – Visited Britain 1826, served at the Mediterranean Sea 1827–1829, hulked 1835
Aleksandr Nevskii 44/62 ("Александр Невский", ex- 74-gun ship, 1826, cut down as 44-gun frigate 1732) – BU 1847

Pallada-class (2 units)

Built according to improved drawings of HMS President (1800)
Pallada 44/52 ("Паллада", 1832) – Visited Britain 1847 and Portugal 1849–1850, served at the Northern Pacific in 1852–1856, flagship of Japanese diplomatic mission of vice-admiral count Yevfimy Putyatin, scuttled to prevent capture in Emperor's Harbour 1856
Diana 44/52 ("Диана", 1852, A) – Served at the Northern Pacific in 1853–1856 consisting of Japanese diplomatic mission of vice-admiral count Yevfimy Putyatin, severely damaged after the 1854 Ansei-Tōkai earthquake and tsunami, sunk in a storm in Shimoda Bay 1855
Narva 58 ("Нарва", ex- 74-gun ship, 1846, cut down as frigate 1855) – Decommissioned 1863
Borodino 58 ("Бородино", ex- 74-gun ship, 1850, cut down as frigate 1855) – Decommissioned 1863
Vilagosh 58 ("Вилагош", ex- 74-gun ship, 1851, cut down as frigate 1855) – Decommissioned 1863
Sysoi Velikii 58 ("Сысой Великий", ex- 74-gun ship, 1849, cut down as frigate 1855) – Decommissioned 1863

Frigates of the Azov Flotilla (1770–1783) of Catherine the Great

Pervyi-class (2 units)

The only two frigates, participated the Russo-Turkish War (1768–1774) consisting of Azov Flotilla
Pervyi 32 ("Первый", 1771) – Wrecked 1775
Vtoroi 32 ("Второй", 1771) – Transferred to the Black Sea Fleet 1783, BU 1783

Tretyi-class (2 units)

Tretiy 58 ("Третий", 1773) – Burnt 1779
Chetviortyi 58 ("Четвёртый", 1773) – Last mentioned 1778

Piatyi-class (3 units)

Piatyi 42 ("Пятый", 1774) – Transferred to the Black Sea Fleet 1783, BU 1785
Shestoi 42 ("Шестой", 1774) – Transferred to the Black Sea Fleet 1783, BU 1785
Sed‘moi 42 ("Седьмой", 1777) - Transferred to the Black Sea Fleet and renamed Kherson 1783, converted to floating battery and renamed Vasilii Velikii ("Василий Великий") 1788, wrecked 1788

Vos‘moi-class (9 units)

Vos‘moi 44 ("Восьмой", 1778) - Transferred to the Black Sea Fleet and renamed Ostoroznyi ("Осторожный") 1783, BU 1790
Deviatyi 44 ("Девятый", 1779) – Transferred to the Black Sea Fleet and renamed Pospeshnyi ("Поспешный") 1783, decommissioned 1786, BU after 1790
Desiatyi 44 ("Десятый", 1779) – Transferred to the Black Sea Fleet and renamed Krym 1783, lost at sea 1787
Odinnadtsatyi 44 ("Одиннадцатый"Ю 1779) – Transferred to the Black Sea Fleet and renamed Khrabryi ("Храбрый") 1783, BU after 1788
Dvenadtsatyi 44 ("Двенадцатый", 1782) – Transferred to the Black Sea Fleet and renamed Strela ("Стрела") 1783, rearmed and renamed as 40-gun frigate Ioann Voinstvennik ("Иоанн Воинственник") 1788, BU after 1792
Trinadtsatyi 44 ("Тринадцатый", 1782) – Transferred to the Black Sea Fleet and renamed Pobeda 1783, rearmed and renamed as 40-gun frigate Matvei Evangelist ("Матвей Евангелист") 1788, BU after 1791

Frigates of the Black Sea Fleet (1783–1855)

Vos‘moi-class (last 3 units)

Chetyrnadtsatyi 44 ("Четырнадцатый", 1783) – Renamed Perun ("Перун"), 1783, rearmed and renamed as 40-gun frigate Amvrosii Mediolanskii ("Амвросий Медиоланский") 1788, hulked as depot 1791
Piatnadtsatyi 44 ("Пятнадцатый", 1783) – Renamed Liogkii ("Лёгкий") 1783, rearmed and renamed as 40-gun frigate Kirill Belozerskii ("Кирилл Белозерский") 1788, converted to floating crane 1791
Shestnadtsatyii 44 ("Шестнадцатый", 1783) – Renamed Skoryi ("Скорый") 1783, rearmed and renamed as 40-gun frigate Fedot Muchenik ("Федот Мученик") 1788, last mentioned 1790
Vestnik 40/32 ("Вестник", ex-merchant vessel, 1781, converted to 40-gun frigate 1783) – Renamed Arkhangel Gavriil ("Архангел Гавриил", 1788, BU after 1790
Grigorii Bogoslov ("Григорий Богослов") (ex-merchant vessel Boristhen ("Бористен"), 1781, converted to frigate 1788) – BU after 1791
Ioann Zlatoust ("Иоанн Златоуст") (ex-merchant vessel Taganrog ("Таганрог"), converted to frigate 1788) – damaged by ice and sunk in 1788/89
Grigorii Velikiya Armenii 26 ("Григорий Великия Армении") (ex-merchant vessel Pchela ("Пчела"), 1782, converted to frigate 1788) – Last mentioned 1791
Antonii ("Антоний") (ex-pink № 1, 1784, converted to frigate 1788) - Burnt 1791
Feodosii ("Феодосий") (ex-pink № 2, 1784, converted to frigate 1788) - Last mentioned 1788
Sergii Chudotvorets 20 ("Сергий Чудотворец") (ex-cutter № 1, converted to frigate 1788) - BU after 1802
Nikolai Chudotvorets 20 ("Николай Чудотворец") (ex-cutter № 2, convert to frigate 1788) - Last mentioned 1790
Sviatoi Georgii Pobedonosets 50/54 ("Святой Георгий Победоносец", 1785) – Classified as 50-gun ship 1788–1793, BU after 1800
Taganrog 40 ("Таганрог", 1785) – BU after 1795

Kinburn-class (3 units)

Kinburn 40 ("Кинбурн", 1786) – Renamed Pokrov Sviatoi Bogoroditsy ("Покров Святой Богородицы") 1788, hulked 1790
Berislav 40 ("Берислав", 1786) – Renamed Luka Evangelist ("Лука Евангелист") 1788, BU 1790
Fanagoriya 40 ("Фанагория", 1786) – Renamed Prepodobnyi Nestor ("Преподобный Нестор") 1788, BU after 1795

Apostol Andrei-class (2 units)

50-gun battlefrigates, 2-deckers
Apostol Andrei 50 ("Апостол Андрей", 1786) – Classified as 50-gun ship 1789–1793, converted to floating crane 1800
Aleksandr Nevskii 50 ("Александр Невский", 1787) – Classified as 50-gun ship 1789–1793, flagship of rear admiral count Nikolai Mordvinov in 1787 and rear admiral Fyodor Ushakov in 1790 during the Russo-Turkish War (1787–1792), voyaged to the Adriatic Sea 1799, last mentioned 1799

Piotr Apostol-class (6 units)

46-gun battlefrigates
Piotr Apostol 46/44 ("Пётр Апостол", 1788) – Classified as 46-gun ship 1789–1793, BU after 1799
Ioann Bogoslov 46/44 ("Иоанн Богослов", 1788) – Classified as 46-gun ship 1789–1793, burnt 1794
Tsar‘ Konstantin 46/44 ("Царь Константин", 1788) - Classified as 46-gun ship 1789–1793, wrecked 1799 (399 men lost including rear admiral I. T. Ovtsyn)
Fiodor Stratilat 46/44 ("Фёдор Стратилат", 1790) – Classified as 46-gun ship until 1793, wrecked 1799 (268 men lost)
Soshestviye Sviatogo Dukha ("Сошествие Святого Духа") (ex-Sviataya Troitsa ("Святая Троица") – renamed on slip) 46/44 (1791) – Classified as 46-gun ship until 1793, served at the Adriatic Sea 1798–1802, last mentioned 1802
Kazanskaya Bogoroditsa 46/44 ("Казанская Богородица", 1791) – Classified as 46-gun ship until 1793, served at the Adriatic Sea 1798–1802, last mentioned 1802
Nikolai Belomorskii 20 ("Николай Беломорский")- ex-xebec, purchased in Eastern Miditerranean 1789, served in Aegean Sea 1789–1792, transferred to the Black Sea Fleet 1792, voyaged to the Adriatic Sea 1801 and 1804, BU after 1808
Sviatoi Matvei 16 ("Святой Матвей") – ex-privateer corvette of Lambros Katsonis Flotilla on Russian service, served at the Aegean Sea 1790–1792, commissioned to the Black Sea Fleet as 16-gun frigate 1792, BU 1804
Navarkhia ("Навархия") (also Vozneseniye Gospodne, "Преображение Господне") 46/40 (1790) – Classified as 46-gun ship until 1793, served at the Adriatic Sea 1798–1802, last mentioned 1802
Sviatoi Nikolai 44/46/50 ("Святой Николай", 1790) – Classified as 46-gun ship until 1793, served at the Adriatic Sea 1798–1802, sold for BU in Naples 1802
Grigorii Velikiya Armenii 60 ("Григорий Великия Армении", 1791) – Served at the Adriatic Sea 1798–1803, converted to hospital vessel in Corfu 1805, sold to France in Corfu 1809
Ioann Zlatoust 32 ("Иоанн Златоуст", 1791) – Voyaged to the Adriatic Sea in 1800 & 1804, last mentioned 1815
Pospeshnyi 32 ("Поспешный", 1793) – Voyaged to the Adriatic Sea 1799–1800, wrecked near Bosporus 1800
Stchastlivyi 36 ("Счастливый", 1793) – Served at the Adriatic Sea 1798–1800, BU 1805
Liogkii 26 ("Лёгкий", 1793) – Voyaged to the Adriatic Sea 1800, BU 1804
Mikhail 50/48 ("Михаил", 1796) – Served at the Adriatic Sea 1798–1803 & 1804–1807, flagship of captain A. Sorokin in 1799, sold to France in Trieste 1809
Nazaret 44 ("Назарет", 1800) – Served at the Adriatic Sea in 1802–1803 & 1805–1806, BU after 1813
Krepkii 54 ("Крепкий", 1801) – Served at the Adriatic Sea 1804–1806, BU after 1812
Liliya ("Лилия", 1806) – Last mentioned 1821

Voin-class (2 units)

Voin 32 ("Воин", 1804) – Last mentioned 1821
Afrika 32 ("Африка", 1811) – Last mentioned 1811
Minerva 44 ("Минерва", 1811) – Converted to harbour vessel 1825

Vezul-class (2 units)

Vezul 32 ("Везул", 1813) – Wrecked 1817
Speshnyi 32 ("Спешный", 1813) – BU 1830
Evstafii 44/48 ("Евстафий", 1817) – Last mentioned 1829
Flora 44/48 ("Флора", 1818) – BU after 1835
Pospeshnyi 44/52 ("Поспешный", 1821) – BU 1839
Shtandart 44/60 ("Штандарт", 1824) – Visited Egypt 1832, Hulked as depot 1841
Rafail 36/44 ("Рафаил", 1828) – Captured by Turkey in 1829 during the Russo-Turkish War (1828–1829) (the reason ship name "Rafail" was prohibited to use in the Russian Navy in future), renamed Fazlullah, destroyed by Russian ships at the Battle of Sinop 1853

Tenedos-class (6 units)

According to their designer, admiral Alexey Greig, this frigates only by a negligible margin inferiored to 74-gun ships of the line
Tenedos 60 ("Тенедос", 1828) – Hulked 1842
Erivan‘ 60 ("Эривань", 1829) - Hulked 1837
Arkhipelag 60 ("Архипелаг", 1829) – Hulked 1838
Varna 60 ("Варна", 1830) – Wrecked 1838
Enos 60 ("Энос", 1831) – Hulked 1845
Burgas 60 ("Бургас", 1832) – Hulked 1842
Agatopol‘ 60 ("Агатополь", 1834) - BU 1853
Brailov 44/46 ("Браилов", 1836) – BU 1851
Flora 44 ("Флора", 1839) – Won an action with 3 Turkish steamers (1853), scuttled to protect the harbour in 1854 during the Siege of Sevastopol
Mesemvriya 60 ("Месемврия", 1840) – Scuttled to protect the harbour in 1855 during the Siege of Sevastopol
Sizopol‘ 60/54 ("Сизополь", 1841) - Scuttled to protect the harbour in 1854 during the Siege of Sevastopol
Midiya 60 ("Мидия", 1843) – Scuttled to protect the harbour in 1855 during the Siege of Sevastopol
Kagul 44 ("Кагул", 1843) – Converted to hospital ship 1854, scuttled to protect the harbour in 1855 during the Siege of Sevastopol
Kovarna 52 ("Коварна", 1845) – Destroyed by coastal artillery fire during the Siege of Sevastopol 1855
Kulevtchi 60 ("Кулевчи", 1847) – Scuttled in Sevastopol in 1855, when Russian troops abandoned the city

Frigates of the Caspian Flotilla

№ 1-class (3 units)

№ 1 20 (1779) - BU 1789
№ 2 20 (1779) - BU 1786
№ 3 20 (1780) - BU 1787

Kavkaz-class (5 units)

Kavkaz 20 ("Кавказ", 1784) – Bombed Baku in 1791, BU 1797
Astrakhan‘ 20 ("Астрахань", 1784) - BU 1798
Kizliar 20 ("Кизляр", 1785) – Last mentioned 1785
№ 1 20 (1798) - Bombed Baku to protect Russian merchantmen in 1799, flagship of lieutenant commander Egor Veselago during the Russo-Persian War (1803-1813), BU 1810
№ 2 20 (1798) - BU 1809
Tsaritsyn 12 ("Царицын", 1795) (rowing) – BU 1808

Rowing frigates
This type of sailing & rowing vessels was intended for the skerries of the Gulf of Finland. These vessels, except for the two Evangelist Mark-class vessels, belonged to the Baltic Rowing (Army) Fleet.

Evangelist Mark-class (2 units)
Evangelist Mark 20/22 ("Евангелист Марк", 1773) – BU 1794
Provornyi 20/22 ("Проворный", 1781) – BU 1789

Ekaterina-class (18 units)
Ekaterina 38 ("Екатерина", 1790) – Burnt to prevent capture at the 2nd Battle of Rochensalm (1790), repaired by Swedes and commissioned as HMS Katarina, further future is unknown
Aleksandr 38 ("Александр", 1790) – Lost at the 2nd Battle of Rochensalm (1790), repaired by Swedes and commissioned as HMS Alexander, further future is unknown
Aleksandra 38 ("Александра", 1790) – BU 1804
Elena 38 ("Елена", 1790) – BU 1802
Konstantin 38 ("Константин", 1790) – Lost at the 2nd Battle of Rochensalm (1790), repaired by Swedes and commissioned as HMS Konstantin, further future is unknown
Mariya 38 ("Мария", 1790) – Captured by Sweden at the 2nd Battle of Rochensalm (1790), overthrew a few hours after
Nikolai 38 ("Николай", 1790) – Sank at the 2nd Battle of Rochensalm (1790), found by divers 1948
Pavel 38 ("Павел", 1790) – BU 1804
Aleksandr 38 ("Александр", 1792) – BU 1804
Ekaterina 38 ("Екатерина", 1792) – BU 1804
Elizaveta 38 ("Елизавета", 1794) – BU 1803
Mariya 38 ("Мария", 1794) – Wrecked 1796
Konstantin 38 ("Константин", 1796) – Visited Britain 1799–1800, BU 1808
Nikolai 38 ("Николай", 1796) – Visited Britain 1799–1800, BU 1809
Bogoyavleniye Gospodne 38 ("Богоявление Господне", 1798) – Withstood an action with two Swedish frigates near Vasa 1809, hulked 1810, BU 1816
Emmanuil 38 ("Эммануил", 1796) – Transferred to the Baltic (Sail) Fleet as 24-gun frigate 1804, BU 1817
Vifleem 38 ("Вифлеем") – BU on slip 1799
Nazaret' 38 ("Назарет") – BU on slip 1799

Hemmemas (6 units)
A hemmema (Russian pronunciation "gemam") was a Swedish design by Fredrik Henrik af Chapman. It was a type of small rowing frigate for archipelago warfare used by the Swedish archipelago fleet.Petergof 32 (" Петергоф", 1808) – BU 1822Bodryi 32 ("Бодрый", 1808) – Damaged during flood in Kronstadt (1824), BU 1829Neva 32 ("Нева", 1808) – BU 1829Sveaborg 32 ("Свеаборг", 1808) – BU 1822Torneo 32 ("Торнео", 1808) – BU 1824Mirnyi 32 ("Мирный", 1823) – BU after 1834

Training frigates
Built special for naval training. Belonged to the Sea Cadet Corps' Squadron.Nadezhda 10 ("Надежда", 1766) (25 cadets) – BU 1774

Malyi-class (6 units)
95 naval cadets.Malyi 24 ("Малый", 1805) – BU after 1820Uraniya 24 ("Урания", 1820) – BU 1838Rossiya 24 ("Россия", 1825) – BU 1842Nadezhda 24 ("Надежда", 1828) – BU 1845Otvazhnost‘ 24 ("Отважность", 1834) - BU after 1858Postoyanstvo 24 ("Постоянство", 1834) – BU after 1858

Vernost‘-class (3 units)
75 naval cadets.Vernost‘ 24 ("Верность", 1834) - Hulked as floating barracks 1854, BU 1858Uspekh 24 ("Успех", 1839) – BU 1855Nadezhda 24 ("Надежда", 1845) – BU after 1858

Prizes (frigates)Karlskron-Vapen 34 ("Карлскрон-вапен", ex-Swedish HMS Karlskrona Vapen, 1703, captured at the Battle of Osel Island 1719) – BU 1737Venker 30 ("Венкер", ex-Swedish HMS Vainqueur, 1720, captured at the Battle of Grengam 1720) – Never commissioned but kept as a memorial, BU 1738Dansk-Ern 18/24 ("Данск-Эрн", ex-Danish Svarta Örn, 1715, captured by Sweden in 1717 and renamed HMS Danska Örn, captured by Russians at the Battle of Grengam 1720) – memorial 1728, BU after 1737Kisken 22/32 ("Кискен", ex-Swedish HMS Kiskin, 1715, captured at the Battle of Grengam 1720)) – BU 1738Stor-Feniks 34/32 ("Стор-Феникс", ex-Swedish HMS Stora Fenix II (Fenix), 1708, captured at the Battle of Grengam 1720)) – BU after 1738Brilyant 30 ("Брильянт", ex-French Le Brillant, ?, captured during the Siege of Danzig (1734)) – BU after 1746Ul‘riksdal‘ 24 ("Ульриксдаль", ex-Swedish HMS Ulriksdal, 1738, heavily damaged in storm and captured near Reval in 1742 during the Russo-Swedish War (1741–1743)) – BU after 1773Arkhipelag 30 ("Архипелаг", ex-Turkish vessel ?, captured in Aegean Sea 1770, converted to Baltic Fleet's frigate) – Served at the Aegean Sea 1770–1775, transferred to the Azov Flotilla 1775, converted to transport vessel 1782, wrecked 1782Delos ("Делос", ex-Turkish vessel ?, captured in Aegean Sea 1770, converted to Baltic Fleet's frigate) – Served at the Aegean Sea 1770–1775, sold for BU in Naoussa 1775Zeya ("Зея", ex-Turkish vessel ?, captured in Aegean Sea 1770, converted to Baltic Fleet's frigate) – BU in Naoussa 1772Milo ("Мило", ex-Turkish vessel ?, captured in Aegean Sea 1770, converted to Baltic Fleet's frigate) – BU in Naoussa 1772Naktsiya 22 ("Накция", ex-Turkish vessel ?, captured in Aegean Sea 1770, converted to Baltic Fleet's frigate) – Served at the Aegean Sea 1770–1775, sold for BU in Naoussa 1775Tino ("Тино", ex-Turkish vessel ?, captured in Aegean Sea 1770, converted to Baltic Fleet's frigate) – Served at the Aegean Sea 1770–1775, transferred to the  Azov Flotilla 1775, last mentioned 1775Andro ("Андро", ex-Turkish vessel ?, captured in Aegean Sea 1771, converted to Baltic Fleet's frigate) – BU in Naoussa 1772Mikono ("Миконо", ex-Turkish vessel ?, captured in Aegean Sea 1771, converted to Baltic Fleet's frigate) – BU in Naoussa 1772Minerva 32 ("Минерва", ex-Turkish vessel ?, captured in Aegean Sea 1771, converted to Baltic Fleet's frigate) – Served at the Aegean Sea 1771–1774, wrecked at the Baltic Sea 1774Santorin ("Санторин", ex-Turkish vessel ?, captured in Aegean Sea 1771, converted to Baltic Fleet's frigate) – Wrecked in Mytilene harbour and burnt to protect the capture 1771Sviatoi Mark ("Святой Марк", ex-Turkish galley Makroplea, captured at the Dnepr Liman in 1788, converted to frigate) – BU after 1800Avtroil 24 ("Автроил", ex-Swedish HMS af Trolle, 1767, captured at the First Battle of Rochensalm (1789)) – Flagship of vice-admiral T. Kozlianonov in the Battle of Vyborg Bay and 2nd Battle of Rochensalm (1790) (2nd flag), served at the Adriatic Sea 1805–1807, sold to France in Venice 1809Oden 38/28-gun hemmema ("Оден", ex-Swedish HMS Oden, 1764, captured at the First Battle of Rochensalm (1789), classified as hemmema) – Captured by Sweden at the 2nd Battle of Rochensalm (1790), re-captured by Russia in Sveaborg (1808) and as half-hemmama Oduen ("Одуен") commissioned to the Baltic Rowing Fleet, last mentioned 1808Venus ("Венус", ex-Swedish HMS Venus, 1783, captured in Oslofjord in 1789 during the Russo-Swedish War (1788–1790)) – Distinguished herself in Battle of Vyborg Bay under the command of captain Roman Crown, visited Holland 1793, visited Britain in 1793, 1795–1797 & 1799–1800, served at the Adriatic Sea in 1805–1807 and at the Aegean Sea in 1807, sold to Kingdom of Naples in Palermo to prevent capture 1807la Brune (ex-French, ?, captured during Corfu assault (1799) by admiral Fyodor Ushakov's Russo-Turkish Squadron) – Delivered to Turkey, further fate is unknownGel‘gomar 26-gun hemmema ("Гельгомар", ex-Swedish HMS Hjalmar, 1790, captured in Sveaborg 1808, commissioned to Baltic Rowing Fleet) – BU 1829Stor-Byorn 26-gun hemmema ("Стор-Бьорн", ex-Swedish HMS Styrbjörn, 1790, captured in Sveaborg 1808, commissioned to Baltic Rowing Fleet) – Flagship of lieutenant commander Ivan Novokshenov at the Battle of Jungfrusund (1808) during the Russo-Swedish War (1808–1809), hulked as floating barracksMagubei-Subhan ("Магубей-Субхан", ex-Turkish Mahubey Subham, captured near Penderaklia in 1811 during the Russo-Turkish War (1806–1812)) – BU after 1818

References

BibliographyVeselago F. F. Spisok russkikh voyennykh sudov s 1668 po 1860 god. – Tipographia Morskogo Vedomstva, Saint Petersburg, 1872 (List of Russian naval ships from 1668 to 1860)Chernyshev A. A. Rossiyskiy parusnyi flot. Spravochnik. T. I. – Voyenizdat, Moskva, 1997 (Russian Sailing Fleet. Reference-book)Russian Warships in the Age of Sail, 1696–1860: Design, Construction, Careers and Fates. John Tredrea and Eduard Sozaev. Seaforth Publishing, 2010. .
Boyevaya letopis‘ russkogo flota. Khronika vazhneishikh sobytii voyennoi istorii russkogo flota s IX veka po 1917 god. - Voyenizdat, Moskva, 1948. (Combat Annales of the Russian Navy. Chronicle of the Most Important Events of the Russian Navy History from the 9th century up to 1917)Mitrofanov V. P., Mitrofanov P. S.'' Shkoly pod parusami. Uchebnyi parusnyi flot XVIII–XX vekov. – Sudostroyeniye, Leningrad, 1989. (Schools under the Sail. Training Sail Fleet in XVIII–XX cc.)
Information of Swedish warships by Jan-Erik Karlsson

Sail
Sail Frigates
Sail Frigates
Sail Frigates
Russia
Sail Frigates
Lists of frigates
Sail Frigates
Sail Frigates